The 2003 North Hertfordshire District Council election was held on 1 May 2003, at the same time as other local elections across England and Scotland. 16 of the 49 seats on North Hertfordshire District Council were up for election, being the usual third of the council.

Overall results
The overall results were as follows:

Ward Results
The results for each ward were as follows. An asterisk(*) indicates a sitting councillor standing for re-election. A double dagger (‡) indicates a sitting councillor contesting a different ward.

References

2003 English local elections
2003